A referendum on electoral reform was supposed to be held in the province of New Brunswick, Canada on May 12, 2008.  The date was announced by Premier Bernard Lord on June 20, 2006 in announcing his response to the 2004 report of the Commission on Legislative Democracy. However, Lord and his Progressive Conservatives were defeated in the September 2006 election and the new Liberal government, which had always expressed skepticism about the model proposed by the Commission and its mandate opted not proceed with a referendum in an announcement on June 28, 2007.

The proposal was on a mixed member proportional representation system which would see 36 members elected to the Legislative Assembly of New Brunswick in first past the post single member ridings and 20 additional members elected from 4 regions, using closed lists, to ensure proportionality. The threshold for proportional representation seats would be 5% of the provincial vote.

In October 2010, after the 2010 New Brunswick election, the group New Brunswickers For Proportional Representation was formed to push for the implementation of proportional representation as outlined by the Commission on Legislative Democracy.

References

External links
Commission on Legislative Democracy

Electoral reform referendum
Cancelled referendums
Electoral reform referendums in Canada
2008 elections in Canada
2008 referendums
2008 in New Brunswick